The Glasgow Harbour Tunnel Rotundas are two red brick stone rotundas which flank the River Clyde in Glasgow, Scotland. The North Rotunda is located on Tunnel Street in the Finnieston area of Glasgow with the South Rotunda at Plantation Place in Govan.

History
Designed by Simpson and Wilson, and built between 1890 and 1896 by Glasgow Tunnel Company, the Rotunda covered  shafts to tunnels which enabled vehicular and pedestrian access to the other side of the river.

Pedestrians, horses and carts – and later motor vehicles – would be hauled up by hydraulic lifts provided by Otis Elevator Company of New York.

During the Second World War, the tunnels were temporarily closed because all the metal from the lifts was removed to contribute to the war effort.

The tunnels were an expensive venture to run and were passed to the council to run as a service in 1926.

The increased costs of running the tunnels which were prone to damp and the increase of motor cars on the roads lead to the closure of the pedestrian tunnel in 1980, and the vehicular tunnels being filled in 1986. Though the pedestrian tunnel still exists, it is closed to the public.

Originally, three-storey red and white brick towers stood alongside the Rotundas, containing the hydraulic accumulators that powered the lifts, but these have been demolished.

Other uses 

Over the years, the Rotundas have served many functions including during the Glasgow Garden Festival in 1988 when one housed a replica of the famous Nardini’s ice cream parlour in Largs. The site has also served as a science centre, The "Dome of Discovery", which was funded by Glasgow City Council and BP Exploration to "celebrate the scientific and industrial culture of the city".

In 2014, the National Theatre of Scotland took over the South Rotunda, with "The Tin Forest" project, creating a pop-up arts venue for performance and visual art as part of Festival 2014, the Commonwealth Games strand of the Glasgow 2014 Cultural Programme.

Current use 

The North Rotunda is currently in use as a restaurant known as Cranside Kitchen as well as a brand new wedding venue known at "The North Rotunda". Whilst the South has been redeveloped as an office for a local shipping and marine engineering company.

The two Rotundas are category B listed buildings, with the South Rotunda identified as being "at risk".

References

External links
Video footage of the North & South Rotundas

Buildings and structures in Glasgow
Category B listed buildings in Glasgow
Tunnels in Scotland
Transport in Glasgow
Infrastructure completed in 1896
1890s in Glasgow
Govan
1896 establishments in Scotland
Transport infrastructure completed in 1896